Caladenia atrata, commonly known as dark caladenia is a plant in the orchid family Orchidaceae and is endemic to Tasmania. It is a ground orchid with flowers that are bright white on the front, but densely covered with black glands on the back.

Description
Caladenia atrata is a terrestrial, perennial, deciduous, herb which usually grows in loose groups.

The petals and sepals are bright white on the front and densely covered with black glands on the back. It is white to pinkish with purple spots and a purple tip, and egg-shaped when flattened. It has three lobes and curves forward, the lateral lobes erect, surrounding the column. There are blunt teeth on the edge of the labellum and three or four rows of stalked, purplish calli along its mid-line. Flowering occurs from late October to December.

Taxonomy and naming
Caladenia atrata was first formally described by David Jones in 1994 and the description was published in Muelleria. The type specimen was collected on a hill in the south-eastern suburbs of Hobart. The specific epithet (atrata) is a Latin word meaning "dressed in black" referring to the black on the outside of the flower.

Distribution and habitat
Dark caladenia is only known from southern areas of Tasmania where it grows on skeletal soils in stunted forest on hillsides.

References

atrata
Plants described in 1994
Endemic orchids of Australia
Orchids of Tasmania
Taxa named by David L. Jones (botanist)